Physiphora elbae is a species of ulidiid or picture-winged fly in the genus Physiphora of the family Ulidiidae.

References

Physiphora